The 2013 FIA European Touring Car Cup was the ninth running of the FIA European Touring Car Cup. It consisted of five events in Italy, Slovakia, Austria and the Czech Republic. The championship was split into three categories: Super 2000, Super 1600, and the Single-Make Trophy for cars such as the SEAT León Supercopa. The Super Production category was abolished for this season. The 2013 season saw the introduction of the Lady Trophy Cup, with the best-placed female driver in either of the categories at each event receiving €10,000 in prize money. Diesel engines were banned from the championship.

Teams and drivers

Race calendar and results

Championship standings

Super 2000/1600

Single-makes Trophy

† — Drivers did not finish the race, but were classified as they completed over 90% of the race distance.

References

External links

European Touring Car Cup
European Touring Car Cup
Touring Car Cup